Alan Schoenberger (born 19 January 1989 in Brisbane, Australia) is an Australian infielder who had played for the Queensland Rams and with the Lakewood BlueClaws of the Philadelphia Phillies organisation.

In the 2010 Claxton Shield, Schoenberger was a regular starter in an under-performing Queensland Rams and batted with a .284 average and slugged .481 including three home runs.

He also played for New Zealand in the 2012 qualifier for the 2013 World Baseball Classic.

References

External links

1989 births
Living people
Australian expatriate baseball players in the United States
Baseball players from Brisbane
Baseball outfielders
Baseball second basemen
Baseball shortstops
Baseball third basemen
Brisbane Bandits players
Clearwater Threshers players
Florida Complex League Phillies players
Lakewood BlueClaws players
Williamsport Crosscutters players